The Autism Research Centre (ARC) is a research institute that is a part of the Department of Developmental Psychiatry at the University of Cambridge, England.

ARC's research goal is to understand the biomedical causes of autism spectrum conditions, to evaluate promising interventions for autistic people, and to improve the health and well-being of autistic people and their families. The ARC collaborates with scientists both within Cambridge University and at universities in the UK and around the world. Professor Simon Baron-Cohen is the director of the ARC and Professor of Developmental Psychopathology at the University of Cambridge, as well as being a Fellow of Trinity College, Cambridge.

Autism Research Trust
The organization known as the Autism Research Trust (ART) exists to support the ARC and promote the general cause of scientific investigation into autism. Prominent individuals associated with the trust include scientific writers such as Lucy Hawking, the daughter of Stephen Hawking.

The ARC has remarked in a statement, "Understanding of autism has developed a great deal over recent years, but there is still a huge amount of work to be done. We cannot leave the responsibility for this research to future generations– we have a responsibility to play our part now."

The Chief Executive is Charlotte Anderson, and the Chairman of the Trustees is Robert Leeming

See also

 Childhood Autism Spectrum Test, an Autism Spectrum screening tool developed at the ARC
 Spectrum 10K, the UK's largest study of autistic people, led by Simon Baron-Cohen under the aegis of the ARC

References

External links
 Official website: Autism Research Centre
 Academic research behind The Transporters

Organizations established in 1998
Institutions in the School of Clinical Medicine, University of Cambridge
Research institutes in Cambridge
Autism-related organisations in the United Kingdom
Medical research institutes in the United Kingdom
1998 establishments in England